15,000 Kids and Counting is a three-part British documentary on Channel 4, first shown in April 2014. It deals with children put up for adoption in the UK. The title is a reference to the American show 19 Kids and Counting.

References

External links
Channel 4 page

Channel 4 documentary series
2014 British television series debuts
2014 British television series endings